The Bells Rock Light was a lighthouse located in the York River in Virginia.

History
In the nineteenth century, West Point, Virginia was the head of navigation on the York River, and this light was requested in order to facilitate navigation there. A house was built for it at Lazaretto Point in 1880, but this was diverted to Thimble Shoal Light when the latter burned down. A second house was constructed and installed on this spot in 1881. Three years later it was struck by a schooner, breaking three of the support columns; these were repaired expeditiously, however, and the light passed the rest of its days uneventfully.

The diminishing of commercial traffic on the river made the light less important, and in 1928 the house was removed and a skeleton tower erected on the iron foundation. This arrangement continues to the present.

References

Bells Rock Light, from the Chesapeake Chapter of the United States Lighthouse Society

Lighthouses completed in 1881
Lighthouses in Virginia
Lighthouses in the Chesapeake Bay
York River (Virginia)
1881 establishments in Virginia
Buildings and structures demolished in 1928